Conus indomaris is a species of sea snail, a marine gastropod mollusc in the family Conidae, the cone snails, cone shells or cones.

These snails are predatory and venomous. They are capable of "stinging" humans.

Description
The size of the shell attains 45 mm.

Distribution
This marine species in the Central Indian Ocean and off Southwest India.

References

 Bozzetti L. (2014). Graphiconus indomaris (Gastropoda: Prosobranchia: Conidae: Puncticuliinae) a new species from Central Indian Ocean. Malacologia Mostra Mondiale. 85: 12-13

External links
 To World Register of Marine Species
 Cone Shells - Knights of the Sea
 

indomaris
Gastropods described in 2014